Emmanuelle Seigner (born 22 June 1966) is a French former fashion model, singer, and actress. She is known for her roles in The Diving Bell and the Butterfly (2007), The Ninth Gate (1999) and Frantic (1988). She has been nominated for a César Award for Best Actress for Venus in Fur (2013), and for two César Awards for Best Supporting Actress in Place Vendôme (1998) and La Vie En Rose (2007). She has been married to Polish film director Roman Polanski since 1989.

Life and career

Seigner was born in Paris to a photographer father and a journalist mother. She is the granddaughter of the actor Louis Seigner, niece of the actress Françoise Seigner and sister of the actress Mathilde Seigner. She was educated at a Catholic convent school, and began modelling at the age of fourteen.

She married Roman Polanski on 30 August 1989, and they have two children: daughter Morgane and son Elvis. Her husband directed her in Frantic (1988), Bitter Moon (1992), The Ninth Gate (1999), Venus in Fur (2013), Based On A True Story (2017) and An Officer and a Spy (2019). In 2010, Seigner was featured in Jerzy Skolimowski's Essential Killing, which went on to win the Special Jury Prize at the Venice Film Festival. In 2012, she played the principal role of Vanda in Polanski's French film adaption of David Ives's two-character play Venus in Fur, based on the Austrian novel of the near-same name, for which she received praise as Vanda, an actress, playing against writer and theatre director Thomas played by Mathieu Amalric.

Seigner appears as the main character in the music video "Hands Around My Throat" by Death in Vegas. In 2006, she became the lead singer of the pop rock band Ultra Orange, and the group's name was changed to Ultra Orange & Emmanuelle. They released a self-titled album in 2007. Seigner released a solo album called  Distant Lover in 2014. She and Polanski live with their two children in Paris. She was an ambassadress of the Polish brand Dr Irena Eris.

Filmography

Discography

Studio albums
 Ultra Orange & Emmanuelle (2007) Sony
 Dingue (2010)
 Distant Lover (2014)
 Diabolique (as L'épée) (2019) (with Anton Newcombe & The Liminanas)

References

External links

 
 
 
 

1966 births
Living people
Actresses from Paris
French female models
French women singers
French film actresses
Roman Polanski
20th-century French actresses
20th-century French singers
21st-century French actresses
21st-century French singers